Chartered in 1866, the Cartersville and Van Wert Railroad was originally planned to connect the Western & Atlantic Railroad at Cartersville, Georgia to the Selma, Rome and Dalton Railroad at Prior, Georgia almost on the Alabama state line.

By 1870 the railroad had  of  broad gauge track connecting Cartersville to Taylorsville, Georgia but further growth was apparently impeded by shady financial dealings by then Governor Rufus Bullock, Hanniball Kimball, and other associates.  These problems caused the railroad to be reorganized as the Cherokee Railroad.

References 

 

Defunct Georgia (U.S. state) railroads
Predecessors of the Seaboard Air Line Railroad
Railway companies established in 1866
Railway companies disestablished in 1870
5 ft gauge railways in the United States
1866 establishments in Georgia (U.S. state)
American companies established in 1866
American companies disestablished in 1870